"Take Me Higher" is a song by American singer Diana Ross, released on August 5, 1995 by Motown Records as the first single from her twenty-first album by the same name (1995). Co-written and produced by Narada Michael Walden featuring additional credits from Mike Mani, it became Ross' fifth number-one on the Billboard Dance Club Songs chart in the US. In Europe, it entered the top forty in Scotland and the UK, but was a even bigger hit on the UK Dance Chart, peaking at number four.

Critical reception
Larry Flick from Billboard described the song as a "swirling retro disco ditty that inspires a wonderfully loose and playful performance", and complimented its chorus as "instantly infectious and brimming with warm optimism." Gil L. Robertson from Cash Box stated that "Lady Ross is in fine form with a confident vocal delivery, while her music backdrop is a throwback to the glory days of disco." The Daily Vault's Mark Millan called it "a fine dance number that Ross revels in". Quincy McCoy from the Gavin Report noted that it "kicks up a happy feeling of nostalgia along with keeping a contemporary feel that brings a smile to your feet." 

Pan-European magazine Music & Media said that here, "La Ross shifts to a higher gear, the pop dance speed." A reviewer from Music Week rated it three out of five, describing is as "a slight affair". Alan Jones deemed it "a fairly innocuous affair – pleasant, undemanding and vaguely anthemic in its regular mix". In an retrospective review, Pop Rescue felt that the singer's vocals "are strong and confident in the verses, but a little weaker in the chorus", adding that "she's joined by backing singers to help lift her higher." James Hamilton from the RM Dance Update declared it as a "soaring anxious wailer".

Music video
The single's accompanying music video featured scenes of Ross in a cocktail dress on stage, while dancers execute a choreography and the band plays the song, intercut with footage of Ross on the beach. The video was later published in November 2009 on her Vevo channel on YouTube, and had generated more than 1,7 million views as of January 2023.

Track listing
 CD single, UK (1995)
"Take Me Higher" – 4:21
"Let Somebody Know" – 4:57
"Too Many Nights" – 4:36

 CD maxi, US (1995)
"Take Me Higher" (12" Mix) – 7:25
"Take Me Higher" (Dub Mix) – 9:34
"Take Me Higher" (A Capella) – 3:44
"Take Me Higher" (LP Version) – 4:13
"Take Me Higher" (Radio Edit) – 4:02
"Take Me Higher" (Instrumental) – 4:11

Credits and personnel
Credits adapted from the liner notes of Take Me Higher.

Patti Austin – background vocalist
Angela Bofill – background vocalist
Sally Jo Dakota – writer
Nikita Germaine – background vocalist, writer
Allen Gregorie – mixing engineer
Sandy Griffith – background vocalist

Kevin Hedge – mixing 
Tony Lindsay – background vocalist
Mike Mani – associate producer
Timmy Regisford – mixing 
Diana Ross – lead vocals
Narada Michael Walden – producer, writer

Charts

See also
 List of number-one dance singles of 1995 (U.S.)

References

1995 songs
1995 singles
Diana Ross songs
Motown singles
Songs written by Narada Michael Walden
Song recordings produced by Narada Michael Walden
Dance-pop songs
Gospel songs
House music songs
Songs written by Sally Jo Dakota